Tarek Chahed (born 23 June 1996) is a German professional footballer who plays as a midfielder for Berliner AK 07.

Early life and career
Chahed was born in Berlin and began playing football at Hertha Zehlendorf when he was six years old. He later moved on to Berliner SC, before joining 1. FC Magdeburg in 2013. 
Regularly captaining the team's under 19 side, Chahed made his senior league debut against Carl Zeiss Jena in May. He later scored his first goal in a match against Hertha BSC II. 

Chahed had already signed a two-year contract with 1. FC Magdeburg in March 2015 and, following the club's promotion to Germany's 3. Liga, he made his professional debut as a substitute in Magdeburg's 2–1 victory over Rot-Weiß Erfurt in the season opener of the 2015–16 3. Liga season.

Personal life
Chahed is of Tunisian descent. His cousin Sofian Chahed was also a footballer.

Honours

Club
1. FC Magdeburg
 Regionalliga Nordost: 2015

References

External links
 

Living people
1996 births
German footballers
German people of Tunisian descent
Footballers from Berlin
Association football defenders
1. FC Magdeburg players
Berliner AK 07 players
2. Bundesliga players
Regionalliga players
21st-century German people